Ethirppukal is a 1984 Indian Malayalam film, directed by Unni Aranmula and produced by Unni Aranmula. The film stars Mammootty, Urvashi, Ratheesh and Shankar in the lead roles. The film has musical score by T. S. Radhakrishnan.

Cast

Mammootty as Kochu Baby
Ratheesh as Raghu
Shankar as Ravi
Menaka as Lakshmi
Urvashi as Sudha
Jalaja as Geetha
Sukumari as Geetha's mother
Manavalan Joseph as Kurup
Adoor Bhavani as Bhargaviyamma
Alummoodan as Pathros
Aroor Sathyan as Thankappan
Bahadoor as Achyuthan Pilla
Jagannatha Varma as Bhargavan Pilla
Mala Aravindan as Ayyappan
Meena as Ravi's mother
P. K. Abraham as Thavalam Chandran Pilla
Pankajavalli as Meenakshiyamma
Philomina as Bharathiyamma
Santhakumari as Mariya
Alleppey Ashraf as Raghus's uncle
Ravi Gupthan as Mathai
Vijayan as Rafhu's friend
Vijayalakshmi as Janamma

Soundtrack
The music was composed by TS Radhakrishnan and the lyrics were written by Unni Aranmula.

References

External links
 

1984 films
1980s Malayalam-language films